The 2019 American Athletic Conference women's basketball tournament was a postseason tournament held from March 8 through 11, 2019 in the Mohegan Sun Arena in Uncasville, Connecticut. UConn was the winner of the American Athletic Tournament and earned an automatic bid to the 2019 NCAA Division I women's basketball tournament.

Seeds
All teams in the American Athletic Conference qualified for the tournament. Teams were seeded based on conference record, and then a tiebreaker system was used. Teams seeded 5–12 played in the opening round, and teams seeded 1–4 received a bye to the quarterfinals.

Schedule
All tournament games are nationally televised on an ESPN network:

Bracket

Note: * denotes overtime

See also

 2019 American Athletic Conference men's basketball tournament

References

American Athletic Conference women's basketball tournament
2018–19 American Athletic Conference women's basketball season
2019 in sports in Connecticut
College basketball tournaments in Connecticut
Sports competitions in Uncasville, Connecticut
Women's sports in Connecticut